Überjam is an album by jazz guitarist John Scofield, the first credited to “The John Scofield Band”. It was released by Verve on January 29, 2002. Saxophonist Karl Denson, guitarist Avi Bortnick, keyboardist John Medeski and drummer Adam Deitch are among the players.

Track listing

Personnel
John Scofield – electric guitar
Karl Denson – flute, saxophone
John Medeski – Hammond B-3 organ, clavinet, mellotron
Avi Bortnick – rhythm guitar, acoustic guitar, samples
Jesse Murphy – bass guitar
Adam Deitch – drums, percussion, rap

References 

2002 albums
Jazz fusion albums by American artists
Verve Records albums
John Scofield albums